Thomas Joseph Campion Jr. (November 14, 1918 – February 8, 1996) was an American football tackle who played one season in the National Football League (NFL) for the Philadelphia Eagles. He played college football at Southeastern Louisiana and was drafted by the Eagles in the 19th round of the 1947 NFL Draft.

Early life and education
T. J. Campion was born on November 14, 1918, in Louisville, Kentucky. He attended Male High School there, before moving to Louisiana to play college football. With the Southeastern Louisiana Lions football team, Campion played four seasons. As a junior in 1942, he led the conference with six blocked punts and was named by Associated Press a "Little All-American." He was the school's first All-America selection. He was a second-team selection at the tackle position. His career was delayed three years due to World War II, in which he served for the United States Navy. He returned to the school in 1946, and earned another All-American selection. He later became one of the first four Southeastern Athletic Hall of Fame members.

Professional career
Campion was selected in the 19th round (170th overall) of the 1947 NFL Draft by the Philadelphia Eagles. He made the final roster and spent the months of September and October as a backup tackle, appearing in five games. On November 4, Campion was sent to the Wilmington Clippers, the Eagles' farm team. Though expected to play, Campion did not appear in any games as a Clipper.

Later life and death
He later worked for the Bob Hook Chevrolet and V. V. Cooke companies. He died on February 8, 1996, in his hometown of Louisville, Kentucky.

References

1918 births
1996 deaths
Players of American football from Kentucky
American football tackles
Southeastern Louisiana Lions football players
Philadelphia Eagles players
Wilmington Clippers players